Edward Leong Che-hung  (born 23 April 1939, Hong Kong) was the non-official member of the Executive Council of Hong Kong.

By training a physician, he graduated from Queen's College, Hong Kong, the University of Hong Kong as Bachelor of Medicine and Bachelor of Surgery. Leong specialises in urology and nephrology.

He became a member of the Legislative Council of Hong Kong, representing the medical constituency after unseating Chiu Hin-kwong in the 1988 election.

Leong was appointed as the chairman of the Hospital Authority in 2002, but stepped down two years later due to mishandling of the SARS outbreak. During his leadership, the HA was ill-prepared for the severe pandemic. He failed to coordinate among different clusters to formulate an effective and comprehensive strategy to respond to the disease. After that, Leong served as the non-official member of the Executive Council from 2005 to 2012. He was chairman of the HKU Council until 6 November 2015 and also chairman of the Standard Working Hours Committee.

Leong was awarded the Gold Bauhinia Star in 2001 and the Grand Bauhinia Medal in 2010.

References

External links

Dr the Honourable LEONG Che-hung, GBS, JP

1939 births
Living people
Hong Kong medical doctors
Alumni of the University of Hong Kong
Members of the Executive Council of Hong Kong
Officers of the Order of the British Empire
Recipients of the Gold Bauhinia Star
Recipients of the Grand Bauhinia Medal
Meeting Point politicians
Hong Kong Democratic Foundation politicians
Members of the Provisional Legislative Council
HK LegCo Members 1988–1991
HK LegCo Members 1991–1995
HK LegCo Members 1995–1997
HK LegCo Members 1998–2000
Hong Kong Basic Law Consultative Committee members
Alumni of Queen's College, Hong Kong